Walt Sales is an American politician who served as a member of Montana House of Representatives for District 69 from 2017 to 2021.

Personal life 
Sales' wife is LaRae Sales. They have three children.

References

External links 
 Walt Sales at ballotpedia.org
 Walt Sales at ourcampaigns.com

Living people
Republican Party members of the Montana House of Representatives
Year of birth missing (living people)
21st-century American politicians